Goch (archaic spelling: Gog, Dutch: Gogh) is a town in the district of Kleve, in North Rhine-Westphalia, Germany.

History

Goch is at least 750 years old: the earliest mention of Goch is in a document dated 1259. It was a part of the Duchy of Cleves. During World War II, the city was completely destroyed by Allied bombers during Operation Veritable.

Twin towns – sister cities

Goch is twinned with:
 Andover, England, United Kingdom
 Meierijstad, Netherlands (formerly Veghel)
 Nowy Tomyśl, Poland
 Redon, France

Notable people
 Otto III (980–1002), Holy Roman Emperor
 Johannes von Goch (c. 1400–1475), Medieval theologian
 Maarten Schenck van Nydeggen (1540–1589), military commander in the Netherlands
 Francisco de Moncada (1586–1635), Spanish author, military leader, and governor of the Spanish Netherlands, died here
 Aenne Biermann (1898–1933), photographer
 Hubert Houben (1898–1956), athlete
 Josefa Idem (born 1964), Italian sprint canoer and politician
 Arnold Janssen (1837–1909), founder of the Society of the Divine Word, a Roman Catholic missionary congregation
 Rita Kersting (born 1969), art historian
Luisa Wensing (born 1993), footballer

Vincent van Gogh, according to his name, which translates to "Vincent of Goch", has ancestors likely native to this location.

Gallery

References

External links

Towns in North Rhine-Westphalia
Kleve (district)